Good For Cows is an experimental jazz band from Oakland, United States. Their line-up consists of Xiu Xiu's current drummer Ches Smith
 and former Xiu Xiu bassist Devin Hoff.

Beginning 
Band claims they formed in Oakland, CA in 1999 "when no one else would show up for band practice".

Discography

References 

American jazz ensembles from California
Asian Man Records artists